Kenneth Thomas Walsh (born May 1947) is an American journalist. From 1994 to 1995, he was president of the White House Correspondents' Association.

Life
Kenneth T. Walsh is the chief White House correspondent for U.S. News & World Report, author of “The Presidency” column for The Report at usnews.com, and writer of a daily blog called “Ken Walsh’s Washington” at usnews.com.

	He joined the magazine in 1984 as a congressional correspondent and has covered the presidency, presidential campaigns, and national politics since 1986. Walsh is one of the longest-serving White House correspondents in history.

	 He has won the two most prestigious awards for White House coverage: the Aldo Beckman Award (twice) and the Gerald R. Ford Prize for Distinguished Reporting on the Presidency (three times). In 2006, he won the Fitzwater Prize for Leadership in Public Communication presented by the Fitzwater Center at Franklin Pierce College.
 
	As an adjunct professorial lecturer in communication at American University in Washington, D.C., Walsh has taught courses on politics and the media, media ethics, how the media shape history, and the “PR presidency.” In 1998, he was named outstanding adjunct professor of the year.

	Walsh served as president of the White House Correspondents’ Association from 1994 to 1995. He started the association's highly successful scholarship program. He has twice served as a judge for the Robert F. Kennedy journalism awards.

	Walsh makes frequent television appearances on networks including ABC, CBS, NBC, CNN, MSNBC, CNBC, Fox News, and C-SPAN, and is often a guest on radio programs across the country. He serves as a commentator on WTOP radio in Washington every Sunday morning. He gives frequent speeches on the presidency, the media, and politics. Walsh's freelance work has been published in the Washington Post, the American Journalism Review, and the New Republic.

	In reporting on the presidency, Walsh has traveled to more than 70 countries and covered a wide range of events, including many superpower summits and international conferences. He has conducted numerous interviews over the years with the presidents he has covered.

	Prior to working at U.S. News, Walsh was Washington correspondent for the Denver Post from 1981–1984. Before that, he covered government and politics for the Denver Post in Denver, and was a newsman and Statehouse correspondent for the Associated Press in Denver for three-and-a-half years.

	Walsh earned a master's degree in communication from American University in Washington, D.C. and a B.A. in journalism from Rutgers University in New Brunswick, New Jersey.

Works
Ultimate Insiders: White House Photographers and How They Shape History (2017) Routledge 
Celebrity in Chief: A History of the Presidents and the Culture of Stardom (2015) Paradigm Publishers, 2015,  
Prisoners of the White House: The Isolation of America's Presidents and the Crisis of Leadership (2013), Paradigm Publishers,  
Family of Freedom: Presidents and African Americans in the White House (2011), Paradigm Publishers,    
From Mount Vernon to Crawford: A History of the Presidents and Their Retreats (2005)| Hyperion Books,       
Air Force One: A History of the Presidents and Their Planes (2003), Hyperion Books, 
Ronald Reagan, Biography (1997) Park Lane Press, 1997, 
Feeding the Beast: The White House Versus the Press (1996).Xlibris Corporation, 2002,

References

U.S. News
https://www.usnews.com/topics/author/kenneth-t-walsh
Keppler Speakers
https://www.kepplerspeakers.com/speakers/ken-walsh

External links

http://kennethwalsh.com/
http://www.usnews.com/news/blogs/ken-walshs-washington

Kenneth Walsh Amazon page 
https://www.amazon.com/Kenneth-T.-Walsh/e/B001H6OX9U/ref=sr_ntt_srch_lnk_1?qid=1500064715&sr=1-1

American male journalists
Rutgers University alumni
American University School of Communication alumni
Living people
1947 births